Aror (Sindhi: اروهڙ) or Alor  or Arorkot (Sindhi: اروهڙ ڪوٽ) is the medieval name of the city of Rohri (in Sindh, modern Pakistan). Aror once served as the capital of Sindh.

History 
As Roruka, capital of the Sauvira Kingdom, it is mentioned as an important trading center in early Buddhist literature. Little is known about the city's history prior to the Arab invasion in the 8th century CE. Sauvīra was an ancient kingdom of the lower Indus Valley. Aror was the capital of the Arorh Dynasty, which was followed by Rai Dynasty and then the Brahman Dynasty that once ruled northern Sindh.

Aror is the ancestral town of the Arora Community. In 711, Aror was captured by the army of Muslim general Muhammad bin Qasim. Arab historians recorded the city's name as Al-rur, Al-ruhr and Al Ror.

In 962 it was hit by a massive earthquake that changed the course of the Indus River and ruined the town's mud brick building, thereby setting into play the city's decline, and eventual re-settlement at Rohri, along the modern-day shores of the Indus.

Ruins
Most of Aror's ruins have been lost, though some arches of a mosque built shortly after the 8th century Arab invasion remain standing. The Kalka Cave Temple, Hindu temple dedicated to Kalkaan Devi still exists near the ruins, and are still used. The Chattan Shah ji Takri shrine is built atop a high rock outside the city, and is traditionally believed to be a companion of Ali, cousin of the Prophet Muhammad.

See also
 Aror University of Art, Architecture, Design and Heritages
 Rohri
 Muhammad bin Qasim ath-Thaqafī
Ottomano C. and Biagi P. 1997 - Palaeopedological observations and radiocarbon dating of an archaeological secyion at Aror (Sindh-Pakistan). Ancient Sindh, 4: 73-80

References

Sukkur District
History of Pakistan
History of Sindh
Chach Nama